Feature comparison of backup software. For a more general comparison see List of backup software.

List

References

Backup software